Chenyang Lu is an engineer and the Fullgraf Professor at Washington University in St. Louis, Missouri, as well as the editor-in-chief of ACM Transactions on Sensor Networks.

Lu was named a Fellow of the Institute of Electrical and Electronics Engineers (IEEE) in 2016 for his contributions to adaptive real-time computing systems.

References 

Fellow Members of the IEEE
Living people
Washington University in St. Louis faculty
21st-century American engineers
Year of birth missing (living people)
American electrical engineers